The 1937 Paris–Tours was the 32nd edition of the Paris–Tours cycle race and was held on 25 April 1937. The race started in Paris and finished in Tours. The race was won by Gustave Danneels.

General classification

References

1937 in French sport
1937
April 1937 sports events